Evan Bruce Eschmeyer (born May 30, 1975) is an American retired professional basketball player who was selected by the New Jersey Nets in the second round (34th pick overall) of the 1999 NBA Draft. He spent six years on the Northwestern University Wildcats, (1993–1999) missing the first two due to a foot injury. He was their 6'11" center, scoring 1,805 points and grabbing 995 rebounds.  He led the Wildcats (he was #1 on the team in scoring and rebounding for three consecutive seasons) to an NIT berth in 1999 with a 15–14 record. In the 1999 Big Ten Conference men's basketball tournament, his 8th seeded wildcats nearly beat the #1 seeded Michigan State Spartans but lost to a last second shot by Spartan great Mateen Cleaves. Eschmeyer played in four NBA seasons from 1999 to 2003. He played for the Nets from 1999 to 2001 and the Dallas Mavericks from 2001 to 2003. He averaged 2.9 pts, 3.9 rebs, and 0.6 blocks per game.

In his four-year NBA career, Eschmeyer played in 153 games and scored a total of 421 points. In October 2004, he retired from basketball because of persistent knee problems. Eschmeyer had four knee surgeries in five years.  Doctors told him to retire or run the risk of very limited mobility when he had children.  He is a Democrat who worked on Barack Obama's 2008 presidential campaign. After working for an environmental law firm in Ohio, Eschmeyer moved to Boulder, Colorado and works as a private investor. Eschmeyer is a lifetime member of Net Impact.

He and his wife Kristina are parents to three children.

NBA career statistics

Regular season

|-
| style="text-align:left;"|
| style="text-align:left;"|New Jersey
| 31 || 5 || 12.0 || .528 ||  || .500 || 3.5 || .7 || .3 || .7 || 2.9
|-
| style="text-align:left;"|
| style="text-align:left;"|New Jersey
| 74 || 51 || 18.0 || .460 ||  || .657 || 4.9 || .5 || .6 || .8 || 3.4
|-
| style="text-align:left;"|
| style="text-align:left;"|Dallas
| 31 || 6 || 9.6 || .420 ||  || .606 || 3.2 || .3 || .3 || .3 || 2.0
|-
| style="text-align:left;"|
| style="text-align:left;"|Dallas
| 17 || 3 || 7.9 || .368 ||  || .750 || 1.7 || .4 || .6 || .4 || 1.0
|- class="sortbottom"
| style="text-align:center;" colspan="2"|Career
| 153 || 65 || 14.0 || .463 ||  || .621 || 3.9 || .5 || .5 || .6 || 2.8

Playoffs

|-
| style="text-align:left;"|2002
| style="text-align:left;"|Dallas
| 3 || 0 || 2.7 || .000 ||  ||  || .7 || .3 || .0 || .3 || 0.0
|- 
| style="text-align:left;"|2003
| style="text-align:left;"|Dallas
| 5 || 0 || 6.4 || .500 ||  ||  || 1.0 || .4 || .6 || .2 || 1.2
|- class="sortbottom"
| style="text-align:center;" colspan="2"|Career
| 8 || 0 || 5.0 || .429 ||  ||  || .9 || .4 || .4 || .3 || .8

Notes

External links
NBA stats @ basketballreference.com

1975 births
Living people
All-American college men's basketball players
Basketball players from Ohio
Centers (basketball)
Dallas Mavericks players
New Jersey Nets draft picks
New Jersey Nets players
Northwestern Wildcats men's basketball players
Ohio Democrats
People from Auglaize County, Ohio
American men's basketball players